The women's high jump event at the 1972 European Athletics Indoor Championships was held on 12 March in Grenoble.

Results

References

High jump at the European Athletics Indoor Championships
High